Eastern Drilling was an offshore drilling contractor headquartered in Grimstad, Norway. In May 2007, Seadrill acquired the company.

History
The company was founded in 2004.

In 2005, Smedvig acquired a 10% stake in the company.

In November 2006, the company signed a $558 million contract for use of its to-be-constructed drilling rig by Total S.A. The rig was being constructed by Samsung Heavy Industries.

In May 2007, Seadrill acquired the company.

References

Companies disestablished in 2007
Defunct companies of Norway
Norwegian companies established in 2004
Non-renewable resource companies disestablished in 2007
Non-renewable resource companies established in 2004